William Johnston McGowan McEwan (20 June 1951 – 17 February 2022) was a Scottish professional football player and manager. He had a 14-year playing career in the Scottish and English professional leagues, playing for seven different clubs. McEwan then undertook a coaching career; he managed six different English league clubs, plus one club on a caretaker basis twice. McEwan was most recently the manager of Antigua Barracuda but left the post in 2011.

Early life
William Johnston McGowan McEwan was born on 20 June 1951 in Cleland, Lanarkshire.

Playing career
McEwan started his playing career as a midfielder with Scottish non-League side Pumpherston Juniors before joining Hibernian in 1969, making 60 appearances and scoring two goals for the Edinburgh club. McEwan left Hibernian in May 1973 to join Blackpool, and went on to play for Brighton & Hove Albion, Chesterfield, Mansfield Town, Peterborough United and Rotherham United whom he left in the 1982–83 season.

Managerial career
McEwan's first coaching appointment was at Sheffield United after he replaced Ian Porterfield as manager on 27 March 1986. The following season Sheffield United finished ninth in Second Division after an unspectacular season. More disappointing performances in the 1987–88 season followed, and McEwan was forced to resign before taking over as manager of Rotherham United and guided them to the Fourth Division championship in the 1988–89 season. McEwan later had a spell as manager at Darlington, but he was replaced by Alan Murray midway through his second season.

McEwan then spent nine years on the coaching team at Derby County. He was caretaker manager there twice in April to June 1995 and in January 2002, after the sackings of Roy McFarland and Colin Todd respectively. In 2003, he was sacked by the then manager John Gregory, but was restored into the post when he was found to have been unfairly dismissed. Altogether he was on the coaching staff under five managers at Derby. He left Derby on 19 October 2004, saying "I am looking for a new challenge. The time was right for me to move on".

McEwan was appointed manager of York City on 10 February 2005, where in his first full season he achieved a position of eighth in the Conference National. McEwan said that he rejected an offer from an unnamed Football League club to take over as their manager in October 2005. During October 2006, he threatened to walk out on the club if the fans were not satisfied with his efforts.

McEwan issued a public apology to York's supporters and on loan West Bromwich Albion striker Rob Elvins after the team's home defeat to Conference bottom club Tamworth on 3 February 2007. McEwan was named Conference National Manager of the Month for April 2007, but was then sacked by York on 19 November 2007.

McEwan was linked with the managerial vacancy at Mansfield Town in March 2008, and he was appointed as manager on a three-year contract on 4 July 2008. He was sacked by the club on 10 December 2008.

McEwan was appointed technical director of the Antigua and Barbuda Football Association in March 2010, and in April was made manager of Antigua Barracuda. He left this position in March 2011.

Personal life and death
McEwan was diagnosed with Parkinson's disease in 2014. He died on 17 February 2022, at the age of 70.

Managerial statistics

Honours

As a player
Hibernian
Scottish League Cup: 1972–73
Drybrough Cup: 1971–72, 1972–73

Mansfield Town
Football League Third Division: 1976–77

As a manager
Rotherham United
Football League Fourth Division: 1988–89

References

External links

1951 births
2022 deaths
People from Cleland, North Lanarkshire
Footballers from North Lanarkshire
Scottish footballers
Association football midfielders
Hibernian F.C. players
Blackpool F.C. players
Brighton & Hove Albion F.C. players
Chesterfield F.C. players
Mansfield Town F.C. players
Peterborough United F.C. players
Rotherham United F.C. players
Scottish Football League players
English Football League players
Scottish football managers
Sheffield United F.C. managers
Rotherham United F.C. managers
Darlington F.C. managers
Derby County F.C. managers
York City F.C. managers
Mansfield Town F.C. managers
English Football League managers
Premier League managers
National League (English football) managers
Scottish expatriate football managers
Derby County F.C. non-playing staff
People with Parkinson's disease
Pumpherston Juniors F.C. players
Scottish Junior Football Association players